2016
Kirk Kelleykahn, "The Whipping Man" West Coast Jewish Theater

References

External links
 NAACP Theatre Awards

African-American theatre
NAACP Theatre Awards
Awards established in 1991